Thomas Fuchs (born 10 November 1957) is a Swiss equestrian. He competed at the 1988 Summer Olympics and the 1992 Summer Olympics.

References

External links
 

1957 births
Living people
Swiss male equestrians
Olympic equestrians of Switzerland
Equestrians at the 1988 Summer Olympics
Equestrians at the 1992 Summer Olympics
Sportspeople from Zürich
20th-century Swiss people